César Rodríguez Luna (born in Mexico City) is a Mexican taekwondo practitioner and international medalist. He competed at the 1982 and 1983 World Taekwondo Championships, where he received a silver in each tournament. Rodríguez is a member of the Taekwondo Hall of Fame. He is the founder and president of Absolut Taekwondo Company in Mexico, served as President of Taekwondo in Tlalpan region of Mexico City, and is author of the book Arte Taekwondo.

Career achievements

1974- Mexican National Champion - Mexico City
1977- Mexican National Champion - Mexico City
1978- 1st Pan American Taekwondo Championships - Mexico City - Gold
1979- North American TKD Championships - Hawaii- Gold Medal
1980- North American TKD Championships - Toronto, Canada - Bronze
1980- Pan American Taekwondo Championships - Houston - Gold
1982- World Taekwondo Championships - Ecuador - Silver
1983- World Taekwondo Championships - Denmark - Silver
1987- Mexico Taekwondo Open Championships -Mexico City - Gold
1989- European Taekwondo Championships - Spain - Silver
1992- US Open Taekwondo Championships - Colorado, USA - Bronze
2003- Pan American  Taekwondo Championships - Gold
2003- USA Open Taekwondo  Championships - Silver
2003- Iberian Taekwondo Games - Silver
2022 guadalajara

References

Mexican male taekwondo practitioners
Living people
Sportspeople from Mexico City
Year of birth missing (living people)
World Taekwondo Championships medalists